The Jagiellonian College is a private non-research university in Toruń, Poland. It was established in 2003.

Universities and colleges in Poland
Universities and colleges in Toruń
Educational institutions established in 2003
2003 establishments in Poland